QOOB was an Italian television channel owned by MTV Italy, launched in 2005 and permanently closed in 2009.

Content 
Was launched in November 2005 as XXXX on Telecom Italia Media analogue television frequencies.

Broadcasting indie music videos and user-generated content, on 8 April 2006 was renamed as Flux and later, on 30 November 2006, was again renamed as QOOB.

From 1 January 2009 to 9 February 2009, Telecom Italia Media has temporarily stopped broadcasting and definitively closed on 3 November 2009.

A program called The QOOB Factory on MTV Brand New broadcast user-generated videos from QOOB website.

On 30 June 2011 QOOB was replaced by a new channel called CanalOne.

References

External links
 QOOB official website 
 QOOB on YouTube 

Music television channels
Telecom Italia Media
Television channels and stations established in 2005
Television channels and stations disestablished in 2009
Defunct television channels in Italy
Italian-language television stations
2005 establishments in Italy
2009 disestablishments in Italy
Music organisations based in Italy